Theatre in Iran (1965) is Bahram Beyzai's seminal research on theater in the Persian world from the ancient times to the twentieth century. It has been described as "the definitive work on the history of Persian theatre."

The text
The chapters of the book were published as articles in advance, i.e. 1962 and 1963. In 1965 the writer published them as namayesh dar Iran (literally meaning "Spectacles in Iran") with the English title of A Study on Iranian Theatre on the back cover. The book became and stayed to be the major contribution in the field. Later, its publication was entrusted to Roshangaran Publishing, which came to be Beyzai's exclusive Persian publisher.

In other languages 
 Beyzaì, Bahram. Storia del teatro in Iran. tr. Mani Naimi. Seattle. 2020.

Notes

References 
 Banham, Martin. The Cambridge Guide to Theatre. Cambridge: Cambridge University Press. 1995. ISBN 0 521 434378
 Author's Page on openlibrary.org

External links
 

Books about Iran
Persian-language books
Iranian books
Works by Bahram Beyzai